Jerry Morrison may refer to:

Jerry Morrison, musician in Bleach (American band)
Jerry Morrison, character in 31 North 62 East

See also
Jeremy Morrison (disambiguation)